Shifra Shvarts (born June, 1949; originally Shifra Leider-Shvarts) is a former Professor at the Center for Medical Education on Ben-Gurion University. She is also a researcher of the history of medicine and serves as the deputy director-general of the International Society for the History of Medicine. And the Deputy Secretary General of the World Organization for the History of Medicine.  

Her research examines the history and development of health services in Israel and the history of public medicine.

Biography 
Shifra Shvarts was born in June of 1949 in Tel Aviv, Israel, to Yeheskel Leider and Batia Ben Ephraim. She and was raised in Ashkelon, and moved to Beer Sheva on 1961. She completed a BA in history and geography, MA in history, and a PhD in health sciences in Ben-Gurion University. on 1993–1994, She also completed her  post-doctoral studies in the field of the history of health and management of health systems at the medical school of the University of Rochester in New York State, 

Since 1995, Shvarts has been a member of the Faculty of Health Sciences at Ben-Gurion University. From 1996 to1998, she also served as chair of the Israel Society for the History of Medicine. And From 2001 to 2004, She served as the director of the Department of Health System Management. 

Since 2002, she has been a member of The Israel National Institute For Health Policy Research at the Gertner Institute for Epidemiology and Health Policy Research, located at the Sheba Medical Center in Ramat Gan. And from 2004, Shvarts has been a faculty member of the Health Sciences Faculty’s Center for Medical Education at Ben-Gurion University of the Negev.

Between 2006 and 2017 Shvarts also served as a researcher at the Gertner Institute. The majority of her research at Gertner focused on the development of health services in Israel, and public health issues during the first decade of Israel being a country, with special emphasis on the organized treatment of ringworm with irradiation in Israel and worldwide.

In 2008, She was elected to serve as deputy director-general of the International Society for the History of Medicine. And in 2014, she was made vice president of the society and coordinator of the editorial board of its scientific journal Vesalius.

Academic research activities 
Professor Shvarts is considered as a founding pioneer in the research fieldon history of the Israeli health system. The central proposition of her research is based on the importance of recognizing the social, cultural, historical, and organizational roots of the health system as a key to understanding its present-day operation. In particular, she studied the growth of the salaried physician model in Israel, and in 1994, She also studied the steps in legislation of the compulsory health insurance law. Her research has yielded new insights on how the health system functions, and her work has also been broadly cited and quoted in the Amora’i Commission Report addressing the regulation of a physicians’ work in the public health system in Israel.<ref>{{Cite web|title=ההסתדרות הרפואית בישראל  דוח ועדת אמוראי לבחינת הרפואה הציבורית ומעמד הרופא בה – תשסג-2002|url=https://www.ima.org.il/heskem/ViewCategory.aspx?CategoryId=4385|access-date=2021-01-23|website=www.ima.org.il}}</ref>

In recognition of her scholarly work, Shvarts was elected to the directorship of The Israel National Institute, in 2002, for the Health Policy Research.

In addition to her research on the history of health services in Israel, Shvarts has also studied the changes in the health system in the State of Israel following its formation as a country. This research focuses on the need for health system changes after the establishment of the state, and the elements involved. These studies constituted the first dissection of the political and economic forces Israeli society—including the Israeli government, the health funds, the Nurses’ federation, the General Federation of Labor, and the Physicians’ Medical Federation.

During the past decade, She has focused her research on various countries worldwide, and Israel in particular, have dealt with the issue of irradiation treatment for ringworm, as well as the latent health and social aspects of this treatment as expressed in the legislation of the Law for Compensation of Ringworm Victims in Israel. Parallel to this, she had performed a historical-academic evaluation of the practical impact of the Compulsory National Health Insurance Law 1994 on the Israeli health system.

 Books 

Shvarts has written four books and co-authored dozens of volumes and over 140 papers and book chapters. All of these works deal with various aspects of the history of health system organization in Israel. Her work Kupat Holim, Histadruth, Memshala (‘Health Fund, Labor Federation, Government’), published by the Ben-Gurion Heritage Institute in 2000, was awarded the Einhorn Prize for Achievements in Hebrew Medical Literature (2003). In 2005, she was awarded the Honorable Order of Kentucky Colonels – The Governor of Kentucky and the Commonwealth of Kentucky Honor Award for her "contribution to the community, state of nation and for special achievements of all kinds". In 2012, her article "The Government of Israel and the Health Care of the Negev Bedouins under Military Government, 1948–1966" (Shvarts S., Borkan J., Muhammad M., Sherf M., Medical History, 47: 47–66, 2003) was selected as one of the highlights of the decade and made freely available through Cambridge University Press platforms.

In her books, Shvarts presents a panoramic view of the political and organizational experience in Mandatory Palestine of the 1920s and 1930s, from the standpoint of how the Jewish community in the Land of Israel confronted the issue of health services organization.

 Selected works 

 Shvarts S., Kupat- Holim Haclalit, The General Sick Fund, 1911-1937, Ben-Gurion Institute and Ben-Gurion University Press, 1997 (Hebrew, 221 pages).
 Shvarts S., Kupat Holim, The Histadruth and the Government, Ben-Gurion University Press and Beith Berl Press 2000 (Hebrew ,288 pages).
 Shvarts S., The Workers' Health Fund in Eretz Israel, The University of Rochester NY and Boydell & Brewer Press, UK.https://boydellandbrewer.com/9781580461221/the-workers-health-fund-in-eretz-israel/
 Shehory-Rubin Z., Shvarts S., "Hadassah" for the Health of the People, Hasifria Hazionit, Jerusalem, 2003 (Hebrew, 222 pages),
 Doron H., Shvarts S., Medicine in the Community, Ben-Gurion University Press, 2004 (Hebrew, 264 pages).
 Shvarts S., Health and Zionism, The University of Rochester NY and Boydell & Brewer Press, UK, 2008 (322 pages).https://boydellandbrewer.com/9781580462792/health-and-zionism/
 Shehory-Rubin Z., Shvarts S., "Hadassah" for the Health of the People, Jerusalem, 2012 (Dekel Academic Press, 296 pages).
 Shehory-Rubin Z., Shvarts S., Alexandra Belkind: A Story of a Pioneering Jewish Woman Doctor, Bahur Pub., 2012 (Hebrew,157 pages).
 Doron H., Shvarts S., Vinker S., Family Medicine in Israel, Ben-Gurion University Publication & the Bialik Institute, 2014 (Hebrew, 204 pages).
 Stoler-Liss, Shvarts. S., Shani M., To Be a Healthy Nation, Ben-Gurion University Publication & the Bialik Institute, 2016 (Hebrew, 338 pages).
 Bar Oz Y., Bin Nun G., Shvarts S., The Israeli Health Care System on the Operating Table - 25 years to the implementation of the National Health Insurance Law, The National Institute of Health Policy Research Publication, 2019 (Hebrew, 300 pages).

Editorship of collective volumes

 Chinitz D., Cohen J. (editors), Doron H., Ofer G., Shvarts S., Simchin E. (contributing editors), Government and Health Systems, Implications of Differing Involvements, John Wiley & Sons, 1998 (623 pages).
 Jotkowitz A., Shvarts S., Autonomy, Altruism and Authority in Medical Ethics: Essays in Honor of Professor Shimon Glick,, Nova Science Publishers Inc. NY, 2015 (205 pages).
 Shvarts S., Sadetzki S., Ringworm - Historical, Medical and Social Aspects of Its Treatment , Ben-Gurion University Publication, May 2018 (585 pages).
 Shvarts S., Bennun G., Haim Doron – My Way in the Health Care System- Conversations and Memories'', Ben-Gurion University Publication. March 2019 (140 pages).
 Shvarts S., Sadetzki S., Ringworm and Irradiation: The Historical, Medical, and Legal Implications of the Forgotten Epidemic, Oxford University Press, 2022. https://www.amazon.com/Books-Shifra-Shvarts/s?rh=n%3A283155%2Cp_27%3AShifra+Shvarts

References

External links 
 Personal page on the Ben-Gurion University website
 Shifra Shvarts on ResearchGate.
Health and Zionism on the University of Rochester Press website
The Workers' Health Fund in Eretz Israel on the University of Rochester Press website

1949 births
Living people
Medical historians
Historians of Israel
People from Tel Aviv
Academic staff of Ben-Gurion University of the Negev
Ben-Gurion University of the Negev alumni
University of Rochester alumni